The 1974 Kansas State Wildcats football team represented Kansas State University in the 1974 NCAA Division I football season.  The team's head football coach was Vince Gibson, who served his eighth and final season.  The Wildcats played their home games in KSU Stadium.  It was the final season for Wildcat quarterback Steve Grogan.

Schedule

Roster

References

Kansas State
Kansas State Wildcats football seasons
Kansas State Wildcats football